Bratkovo is a rural locality (a selo) in Lyubomirovskoye Rural Settlement, Sheksninsky District, Vologda Oblast, Russia. The population was 91 as of 2002. There are 4 streets.

Geography 
Tsibino is the nearest rural locality.

References 

Rural localities in Sheksninsky District